Ipala may refer to:

Ipala, Bam, Burkina Faso
Ipala, Ganzourgou, Burkina Faso
Ipala, Guatemala a municipality in Guatemala
Ipala (volcano) in Guatemala
Ipala Lake in Guatemala
Ipala (Tanzanian ward), a ward in Tanzania